Live World Tour 1992 (international title: Live In Barcelona) is a live video release of Elton John performing some of his hits live in Barcelona, Catalonia (Spain). The concert was recorded on July 21, 1992.  Gianni Versace served as the show's production designer, designing the costumes and lighting.

This concert was a part of The One Tour. The tour that John started to visit some countries that he never visited before like Mexico, Argentina, and Singapore.

Track listing
 "Don't Let the Sun Go Down on Me" - 5:41
 "I'm Still Standing" - 3:02
 "I Guess That's Why They Call It the Blues" - 4:31
 "Tiny Dancer" - 6:23
 "Philadelphia Freedom" - 6:15
 "Burn Down the Mission" - 6:00
 "Simple Life" - 6:07
 "The One" - 5:54
 "I Don't Wanna Go on with You Like That" - 4:33
 "Mona Lisas and Mad Hatters" (1 & 2) - 12:04
 "Sorry Seems to Be the Hardest Word" - 3:58
 "Daniel" - 3:52
 "Blue Avenue" - 4:16
 "The Last Song" - 3:42
 "Funeral for a Friend/Love Lies Bleeding" - 9:51
 "Sad Songs (Say So Much)" - 12:27
 "The Show Must Go On" - 4:14
 "Saturday Night's Alright for Fighting" - 5:09
 "Sacrifice" - 5:16
 "Song for Guy"/"Your Song" - 9:33

Certifications

References

Elton John video albums
Live video albums
Elton John live albums
2002 live albums
2002 video albums